Rigobert Bamundele, best known as Rigo Star, is an appreciated soukous guitarist and composer from DR Congo, now based in Paris. He has played with several major soukous and world music acts, including Papa Wemba's Viva La Musica, Bozi Boziana's Anti-Choc, Kanda Bongo Man, Koffi Olomide, Kelele, Kékélé, and Paul Simon and Fally Ipupa in his 2009 album. His name is mostly associated with Congolese female singer M'bilia Bel, with whom he collaborated almost exclusively throughout the 1990s. He has also released a few solo works, including the 1998 album Attention! with Sam Mangwana on vocals.

Partial discography

Solo
 Got the Feeling (1997)
 Attention! (1998)
 Ne refuse pas (1985)

With M'bilia Bel
 Phénomène (1988)
 Ironie (1993)

With Koffi Olomide
 Aia ai ai la bombe eclate

With Bozi Boziana's Anti-Choc
 Coupe Monte
 Pere Noel Confiance

With Paul Simon
 The Rhythm of the Saints (1990)

Footnotes

Democratic Republic of the Congo guitarists
Living people
Democratic Republic of the Congo expatriates in France
Year of birth missing (living people)